Plamen Markov (born 11 September 1957) is a Bulgarian retired professional footballer who played as a midfielder for clubs in Bulgaria and France. He represented the Bulgaria national team at international level.

Playing career
Markov was born in Sevlievo. He played for the Bulgaria national team on 32 occasions, including a match in the 1986 World Cup against Argentina.

In June 1985 he moved from CSKA Sofia to join French club FC Metz, playing 87 matches for them. After the 1986–87 season he transferred to Grenoble. He retired as a player in 1990.

Coaching career
His first coaching job came with Grenoble, and he was later in charge at his former club, CSKA Sofia, but he was sacked in 1995.

In 2001, he was appointed as coach of the Bulgaria national team. He stepped down as coach of Bulgaria after the Euro 2004 tournament.

He was reappointed as Bulgaria coach in January 2008, but was sacked in December 2008 following three draws in their 2010 FIFA World Cup qualifying campaign.

Personal life
Markov is married and has two daughters.

References

1957 births
Living people
Bulgarian footballers
Bulgarian football managers
1986 FIFA World Cup players
PFC Vidima-Rakovski Sevlievo players
PFC CSKA Sofia players
FC Metz players
Grenoble Foot 38 players
Grenoble Foot 38 managers
UEFA Euro 2004 managers
Ligue 1 players
First Professional Football League (Bulgaria) players
Bulgarian expatriate footballers
Expatriate footballers in France
Bulgarian expatriate sportspeople in France
Bulgaria international footballers
PFC CSKA Sofia managers
Bulgaria national football team managers
People from Sevlievo
Bulgarian expatriate football managers
Association football midfielders
FC Yantra Gabrovo managers
Expatriate football managers in Morocco
Wydad AC managers
Botola managers